Simon Nash (born 7 September 1972) is a British former child actor and television presenter.

Early life 
Simon Nash was born in the United Kingdom on 7 September 1972.

Career 
Nash made his television debut in 1980 at the age of 8 as Sammy in the 1980 sitcom Nobody's Perfect. He later starred as Sean Stebbings in the 1987 black sitcom Tickets for the Titanic, and as Garth Stubbs in the first series of Birds of a Feather. He also played a child who was mistaken for a shoplifter in an episode of Slinger's Day, the only sitcom to star television host Bruce Forsyth. He also voice acted the role of Ten Cents in the 1989 children's television series, TUGS. Nash's final role as an actor occurred in 1998, when he appeared in the television film Big Cat as a Police Constable.

Filmography

References

External links

1972 births
Living people
British male child actors
British male television actors
British male voice actors